Kowloon West is the western part of Kowloon (and New Kowloon).

Kowloon West may also refer to:

 Kowloon West (1991 constituency)
 Kowloon West (1995 constituency)
 Kowloon West (1998 constituency)
 Kowloon West (2021 constituency)
 West Kowloon
 West Kowloon Reclamation
 Diocese of Western Kowloon